"Roam" is the fourth single from The B-52's' 1989 hit album Cosmic Thing.

Roam may also refer to:

 ROAM (real-time optimally adapting mesh), a computer graphics algorithm
 ROAM (Réunion des Organismes d'Assurance Mutuelle) in France
 Roam (public transit), the bus operator in Banff, Alberta, Canada
 Roam (band), British pop punk band
 Roam (musician), a Canadian musician
 Roam Media, an online education brand purchased by Outside (company) in 2021

See also
 Free roam (disambiguation)
 Roamer (disambiguation)
 Roaming (disambiguation)
 Rome (disambiguation)